Although spared from genocide, Chinese Germans were subject to large-scale and systematic persecution in Nazi Germany. Many Chinese nationals were forced to leave the country due to increased government surveillance and coercion. After the start of World War II and the subsequent collapse of Sino-German Cooperation, the Gestapo launched mass arrests of Chinese Germans and Chinese nationals across Germany and sent many to labor camps.

History 
Until the end of the Cold War, few Chinese lived in Germany, as compared to immigrants from other nations, and their influence on German society was limited. Nevertheless, in Hamburg, Bremen, and Berlin, Chinese communities formed. Most of the Chinese who immigrated to Germany in the 19th and 20th centuries were sailors from Guangdong and Zhejiang. These sailors generally went on leave upon docking in German ports; in time, Chinese communities developed there. The Chinatown in the St. Pauli quarter of Hamburg (around Schmuckstrasse), Chinesenviertel, eventually became the largest Chinese community in Germany. By the time the Chinese consulate was established in Hamburg in 1921, more than 2,000 Chinese persons resided in Germany; professional sailors aside, the vast majority were in the catering and entertainment industries, as proprietors of Chinese restaurants, bars, cafes and dance halls. Illegal establishments included opium dens and casinos and weapon smuggling.

Starting in the 1920s, university graduates of Chinese origin emerged in Berlin, and most of them adhered to a radical left-wing ideology. Zhu De, Liao Chengzhi and Zhou Enlai and others later became prominent leaders of the Chinese Communist Party. Others joined the Communist Party of Germany, and founded a saloon called "Circle for the Chinese language".

Initial persecutions 

Initially the everyday life of Chinese people in Germany was unaffected by the Nazi government and Adolf Hitler praised Chinese culture and considered Chinese people to be “Honorary Aryans”.

Later, Chinese people in Germany, some of whom adhered to a right-wing ideology, were targeted for persecution or ethnic cleansing by the Nazi government. Although most of them were not politically active, the government conducted  surveillance on them. Under these circumstances, life became increasingly difficult for Chinese civilians in Germany. Beginning in 1936, Gestapo, local police and custom officers enforced unethical regulations in Hamburg's Chinatown. On January 25, 1938, the Center for Chinese was founded under the control of Reinhard Heydrich, which was dedicated to controlling the size of the Chinese population.

Most members of Germany's Chinese population chose to return to mainland China, but some of them chose to fight in the Spanish Civil War. According to a report composed by the Overseas Community Affairs Council, the Chinese population in Germany was reduced to 1,938 before the beginning of the Second World War.

During the war
After the Chinese government declared war on Nazi Germany following the attack on Pearl Harbor in 1941, the Gestapo launched mass arrests of Chinese Germans and Chinese nationals across Germany, concentrating them in the Arbeitserziehungslager Langer Morgen ("Langer Morgen Labor Camp") in Wilhelmsburg, Hamburg, and used them as slave laborers; many were tortured, bullied, assaulted, or worked to death by the Gestapo.

Post-war
By the end of World War II, every Chinese restaurant in Hamburg had closed; the pre-war Chinese communities in Berlin, Hamburg, and Bremen were all destroyed, and virtually no Chinese presence remained in Germany.

By the time the Republican government began housing German Chinese survivors, only 148 could be identified; most chose to return to mainland China, and only a few remained in Germany. Certain survivors applied for compensation from the authorities, but were denied, as the persecution was not a part of the Holocaust, per se.

In 2009, four students from the University of Konstanz produced a documentary, "A Strange Hometown", which told the story of Hamburg's Chinatown. It was later screened at the 2010 Shanghai World Expo.

References 

Anti-Asian sentiment in Europe
Anti-Chinese sentiment
Chinese expatriates in Germany
Persecution by Nazi Germany
Society of Nazi Germany
Racism in Germany